Sint Maarten (West Frisian: Simmer) is a village in the Dutch province of North Holland. It is a part of the municipality of Schagen, and lies about 15 km north of Alkmaar.

The village was first mentioned in 1289 as Niwelant. The current name is a reference to Martin of Tours. Sint Maarten developed in the 13th century along the West-Frisian sea dike. A church was built in 1462, but was destroyed in 1799. In 1875, a new church was built and demolished in 1960.

Sint Maarten was home to 246 people in 1840. It was a separate municipality until 1990, when it was merged with Harenkarspel. Harenkarspel merged with Schagen in 2013.

References

External links

Schagen
Populated places in North Holland
Former municipalities of North Holland